Pusiola hemiphaea is a moth in the subfamily Arctiinae. It was described by George Hampson in 1909. It is found in Togo and Uganda.

References

Moths described in 1909
Lithosiini
Moths of Africa